Souk El Omrane (Arabic : سوق العمران ) is one of the markets of Bab Jebli in the medina of Sfax.

Localization 
The souk was located right next to the path that passes from the west of the medina.

History 
Souk El Omrane was originally a grave yard that was later on transformed to a warehouse for graves called as "The Hotel Of Coffins".

In 1949, the Islamic Association of Conserving Graveyards transformed it into a souk specialized in selling grains and oils. All of the souk's income were dedicated for the restoration of the graveyard's fences.

References 

El Omrane